Chuvash national symbols - spiritual symbols of ancient Chuvash, are valuable historical and cultural heritage of Chuvashia. Symbols are used in national ornaments of embroidery, jewelry, artwork, etc.

Main pictographic symbols

The colors in the Chuvash ornament  
 Red - the color of life, courage, love
 White - the color of truth, purity, wisdom
 Black - the color of agriculture and death
 Green - the color of nature
 Blue - the color of the sky
 Yellow - the color of the sun
The main colors of ornaments are white, red and black.

Literature 
 Ф.В. Искендеров, И.Ф. Искендеров, Е.Ф. Костина Азбука чувашских орнаментов и эмблем. — перераб. и доп. издание, Ulyanovsk,: 2008.

See also 
 Chuvash embroidery

Links 
 Modern interpretation of the Chuvash characters
 The alphabet of the Chuvash ornaments and emblems

National symbols
Ornaments